Fran Millar (born December 9, 1949) is an American politician. He is a former member of the Georgia State Senate from the 40th District, serving from 2011 to 2019. He is a member of the Republican Party. Millar served in the Georgia legislature beginning in 1999, both in the House of Representatives and the Senate.

Early life 
On December 9, 1949, Millar was born in New London, Connecticut.

Education 
Millar earned a Bachelor of Arts in economics from West Virginia Wesleyan College.

Career 
Millar was an independent consultant, and serves as an ex officio member of the Dunwoody Homeowners board of directors.

Millar is a very active member at Dunwoody United Methodist Church and Cherokee Town and Country Club.

Millar has been in public office for since 1999. He has served as a representative to Georgia's 79th House District and senator to Georgia's 40th Senate District.

Millar served his first terms in the state legislature in 1998–2010 with the House of Representatives. He was recognized as Policymaker of the Year in 2008 by the Georgia Association for Career and Technical Education. He was also awarded the 2010 Advocacy Award by All About Developmental Disabilities. He was first elected to the state senate in 2010. In 2012, the National Federations of Independent Business (NFIB) awarded Senator Millar with the Guardian of Small Business Award. In 2013, Senator Millar was recognized by the American Conservative Union (ACU) for his support of bills based on conservative principles during the legislation session. In 2014 he was named the Georgia Chamber's 'Legislator of the Year'.

In 2017, Millar – chairman of the state senate's Higher Education Committee – was one of four Republican senators who voted against a bill that would allow licensed individuals to carry handguns onto public university campuses across the state of Georgia.

On November 6, 2018, Millar was defeated by Sally Harrell, a former state representative

Controversy
In 2014, Fran Millar sparked outrage when he suggested that he opposes new Sunday voting hours because they are only in 3 Democratic majority precincts (African-American majority) versus countywide. The locations were amended as a result of his complaint.

In 2017, Millar admitted to gerrymandering, saying "I'll be very blunt: These lines were not drawn to get Hank Johnson's protégé to be my representative. And you didn't hear that," and "They were not drawn for that purpose, OK? They were not drawn for that purpose."
Also in 2017, Fran Millar was accused of engaging in money laundering activities for Congressman Buddy Carter. This Democratic complaint was subsequently dismissed as frivolous.

Personal life 
Millar's wife is Mary. They have three children, Lisa, Bill, and Meredith.

References

External links 
 Senator Fran Millar
 Fran Millar at ballotpedia.org

Living people
Republican Party Georgia (U.S. state) state senators
1949 births
Politicians from New London, Connecticut
21st-century American politicians